Hero for a Day is a 1939 American drama film directed by Harold Young and written by Harold Buchman. The film stars Anita Louise, Dick Foran, Charley Grapewin, Emma Dunn, David Holt and Berton Churchill. The film was released on October 6, 1939, by Universal Pictures.

Plot

Cast        
Anita Louise as Sylvia Higgins
Dick Foran as 'Brainy' Thornton
Charley Grapewin as Frank Higgins
Emma Dunn as 'Mom' Higgins
David Holt as Billy Higgins
Berton Churchill as Dow
Samuel S. Hinds as 'Dutch' Bronson
Richard Lane as Abbott
Jerry Marlowe as Fitz
Frances Robinson as Jean
Dorothy Arnold as Dorothy
John Gallaudet as Luke Kelly

References

External links
 

1939 films
American drama films
1939 drama films
Universal Pictures films
Films directed by Harold Young (director)
American black-and-white films
1930s English-language films
1930s American films